Arumeru District (Meru District and Arusha Rural District) is a former district in the Arusha Region of Tanzania.  It was bordered to the north, west, and southwest by Monduli District, to the southeast by the city of Arusha, and to the east by the Kilimanjaro Region.

, the population of the Arumeru District was 516,814.

Administrative subdivisions

Constituencies
For parliamentary elections, Arusha Region is divided into constituencies. As of the 2010 elections Arumeru District had two constituencies, Arumeru West (Arumeru Magharibi) Constituency and Arumeru East (Arumeru Mashariki) Constituency.

Divisions
Beginning in 2007 Arumeru District has been administered by two district councils: Arusha District Council and Meru District Council.  Arusha District Council administers three divisions, 20 wards, 75 villages, 294 hamlets and 64,339 households.  Meru District Council administers three divisions, 17 wards, 71 villages and 281 subvillages.

Wards
The Arumeru District is administratively divided into 37 wards:

 Akheri
 Bangata
 Bwawani
 Ilkiding'a
 Kikatiti
 Kikwe
 Kimnyaki
 King'ori
 Kiranyi
 Kisongo
 Leguruki
 Makiba
Lemanyata
 Maji ya Chai
 Maroroni
 Mateves
 Mbuguni
 Mlangarini
 Moivo
 Moshono
 Murieti
 Musa
 Mwandeti
 Nduruma
 Ngarenanyuki
 Nkoanrua
 Nkoaranga
 Nkoarisambu
 Oldonyosambu
 Oljoro
 Olkokola
 Oltroto
 Oltrumet
 Poli
 Singisi
 Sokoni II
 Songoro
 Usa River

Economy
The district economy is almost entirely agricultural, consisting mostly of subsistence farming and livestock raising.  Exports from the few large-scale commercial horticultural farms bring in most of the money in the district. In 2012, that economy in Arumeru District was threatened when, local landless residents forcibly occupied some of those commercial farms.

References

 
Districts of Arusha Region